The men's 200 metres event at the 1983 Pan American Games was held in Caracas, Venezuela on 25 and 26 August.

Medalists

Results

Heats
Wind:Heat 1: -0.3 m/s, Heat 2: -2.5 m/s

Final
Wind: -1.3 m/s

References

Athletics at the 1983 Pan American Games
1983